Rock Cave is a census designated unincorporated community in Upshur County, West Virginia, United States. The town is located southwest of Buckhannon at the junction of West Virginia Route 4 with County Routes 11/2 and 20/28.

Throughout the community's history, Rock Cave has been known as Bob Town, Centerville, and Centreville.

The community's name is a corruption of Rock Lava, which referred to rocks purportedly of volcanic origin unearthed near the town site.

Rock Cave's public schools are operated by Upshur County Schools.

Demographics

2020 Census 
As of the 2020 census, there were 319 people and 204 households. There were 153 housing units in Rock Cave. The racial makeup of the city was 94.4% White, 0.3% African American and 0.3% from other races, and 5% from two or more races. Hispanics or Latinos of any race were 0.9% of the population.

Of the 204 households,  34.8% were married couples living together,  48% had a male householder with no spouse present, 17.2% had a male householder with no spouse present.The average household and family size was 2.97. The median age was 44.8 years. The median income for a household in the community was $32, 667 and the poverty rate was 7.8%

References

Population 2011 1126

Unincorporated communities in Upshur County, West Virginia
Unincorporated communities in West Virginia